Tori Fatehpur ( or टोडी फ़तेहपुर), also known as Tori, was a princely state in India during the British Raj. It was one of the Hasht-Bhaiya Jagirs, under the Bundelkhand Agency of British India. Today it is part of Jhansi District in the state of Uttar Pradesh.

History
Tori Fatehpur State was founded in the Bundelkhand region in 1812 by a descendant of the royal family of Orchha Diwan Rai Singh of Baragaon near Jhansi. He had eight sons who were granted Jagirs, including Dhurwai, Bijna, and Tori Fatehpur.

Tori Fatehpur is on a hill near Gursarai, about 100 km from Jhansi. The fort on the hill is more than 300 years old.

A part royal family started living in a town near Jhansi in the late 1880s after a massive drought and adapted a name “Biswari” for survival. After drought state lost all of its trade and other sources of fortune which resulted in downfall of state.

After Indian independence, on 1 January 1950, Tori Fatehpur acceded to the Republic of India and was merged into the Indian state of Vindhya Pradesh.

See also
 Bundelkhand Agency
 Political integration of India

References

External links
Tori Fatehpur Princely State

Jhansi district
Princely states of Madhya Pradesh
1812 establishments in Asia